"Remembering the First Time" is a song by British soul and pop band Simply Red. Written by frontman Mick Hucknall, it was featured on their fifth album, Life (1995), and released in December 1995 in a new remix for the single. It reached number 22 on the UK Singles Chart and number three on the UK Club Chart. The song also peaked at number seven in Iceland, number 19 in Spain, and number 23 in the Netherlands. On the Eurochart Hot 100, it reached number 80.

Critical reception
AllMusic editor William Ruhlmann complimented the song as "promising". Swedish Expressen felt it "is like browsing a tribute book about modern soul music; - Chic guitar, Dr. Dre synth, house piano and a breath-taking wind instrument arrangement that is sent down from the sky with Federal Express." Caroline Sullivan from The Guardian noted the song's "oscillating keyboard note". A reviewer from Music Week rated it five out of five, stating that it "is bound to follow in the footsteps of its successor, with the same up-beat melody and a refrain to stir heartstrings nationwide."

Calvin Bush from Muzik complimented Hucknall for picking the right remixer for the track, writing, "Here, Dave Valentine's Self Preservation Society bin Mick's vocals, put their heads down and happily march to acid house land aimed with lancing beats and smokescreen strings". In an retrospective review, Pop Rescue declared it as "upbeat", with some piano and bassline "carrying Mick's vocals along." Brad Beatnik from the RM Dance Update gave it four out of five, saying that "it might not be as immediate" as "Fairground", but "is still a convincing combination of club class and commercial hooks."

Music video
The accompanying music video for "Remembering the First Time" was directed by Irish filmmaker Michael Geoghegan.

Track listings

 EW015CD1
 "Remembering the First Time" (radio disco mix) (4:36)
 "Remembering the First Time" (album version) (4:42)
 "Enough" (live) (5:45)
 "A New Flame" (live) (4:35)

 EW015CD2
 "Remembering the First Time" (Extended Cool Disco Mix) (5:30)
 "Remembering the First Time" (SPS Mambo Mix) (9:00)
 "Remembering the First Time" (Satoshi Tomiie Classic 12-inch mix) (8:51)
 "Remembering the First Time" (Too Precious 12-inch dub) (7:14)
 "Remembering the First Time" (Remembering the Ambient Times)

 0630-13394-0 German 33rpm 12-inch single
A1. "Remembering the First Time" (Satoshi Tomiie Classic 12-inch mix) (8:50)
A2. "Remembering the First Time" (7-inch Cool Disco Mix) (4:34)
B1. "Remembering the First Time" (A&G Division's Full Testament) (12:06)

 EW015C cassette
 "Remembering the First Time" (radio disco mix) (4:36)
 "Remembering the First Time" (Too Precious 12-inch mix) (7:14)

Charts

References

1995 singles
1995 songs
East West Records singles
Music videos directed by Michael Geoghegan
Simply Red songs
Songs written by Mick Hucknall